Terry Stone (born 13 January 1971) is a British actor, film producer and author. Before a career in film, Stone was a rave promoter, and is the founder of One Nation, Garage Nation, and Rave Nation.

Biography
Stone was born in Brixton, London, and grew up in Putney, Kingston, and Camberley. As a child, his admiration for Don King led him to want to pursue a career into boxing. After visiting Sterns Nightclub in Worthing  in the early 1990s, he first became involved in 'flyering' (distribution of flyers) for the rave scene before being asked to become involved in a club in Aldershot. From there, he became known as Terry Turbo and founded the jungle and drum and bass One Nation raves, followed by the UK garage Garage Nation events and finally Rave Nation. His 2006 book "King of Clubs" recalls those days.

Stone began his acting career in 2003, appearing in Hell to Pay. He has also appeared in British television series such as EastEnders, The Bill, and My Family. However, he is most notable for his role as Tony Tucker, in the 2007 film Rise of the Footsoldier. 

Stone is now involved in a cryptocurrency project called Filmcoin. 

Stone currently resides in Windsor with his family.

Filmography
My Family (2003, 1 episode) as Debt Collector
EastEnders (2003, 2 episodes) as Mick
One Man and His Dog (2004) as Gary (GBH)
The Baby Juice Express (2004) as Repro Man
The Bill (2005, 1 episode) as Lawrence Trent
Crush (2005) as Tommy
Hell to Pay (2005) as Johnny Murphy
Rollin' with the Nines (2006) as Detective Andy White
Rise of the Footsoldier (2007) as Tony Tucker
Ten Dead Men (2008) as Hart
The Big I Am (2009) as Skipper
Doghouse (2009) as Sergeant Gavin Wright
Unarmed But Dangerous (2009) as RonJack Said (2009) as The FixerBasement (2009) as Producer/Casting DirectorShank (2010) as PapaBonded by Blood (2010) as Tony TuckerThe Holding (2011) as Karsten RabeAnuvahood (2011) as TerryOutside Bet (2011) as Johnny GossamerSaving Santa (2013)Plastic (2013)Get Lucky (2013)Away (2016)Rise Of The Footsoldier 3: The Pat Tate Story (2017) as Tony TuckerOnce Upon a Time in London (2019)Rise Of The Footsoldier 4: Marbella (2019) as Tony TuckerRise Of The Footsoldier: Origins (2021) as Tony Tucker

References

External links

https://www.audible.co.uk/pd/King-of-Clubs-Audiobook/B08BW1D9PB?source_code=AUKFrDlWS02231890H6-BK-ACX0-203524&ref=acx_bty_BK_ACX0_203524_rh_uk

Further reading
Turbo, Terry. King of Clubs: Sex, Drugs & Thugs - A Decade of Dance''. Monday Books, 2016.

Living people
1971 births
People from Kingston upon Thames
Male actors from London
English male film actors
English male television actors